Seh Shah (also Romanized as Seh Shāḥ; also known as Seh Shākh) is a village in Dar Agah Rural District, in the Central District of Hajjiabad County, Hormozgan Province, Iran. At the 2006 census, its population was 16, in 6 families.

References 

Populated places in Hajjiabad County